Ellie Cohanim (born December 10, 1972) is an American broadcast journalist who served as Deputy Special Envoy to Monitor and Combat Anti-Semitism at the United States Department of State during the Donald Trump administration.

Education
Cohanim earned her B.A. in Political Science from Barnard College, Columbia University. She conducted graduate studies in International Relations at the Hebrew University of Jerusalem, Israel.

Career
Prior to her position at the United States Department of State, she was a Special Correspondent and Senior Vice President for Jewish Broadcasting Service (JBS) and an Executive at Yeshiva University, the Jewish Theological Seminary of America and UJA-Federation of New York.

Cohanim has criticized the government in Iran and what she has termed their "obsessive anti-Semitism". Cohanim criticized the social media company Twitter over what she deemed their hypocrisy in refusing to censor the Twitter account of the Iranian Supreme Leader Ayatollah Khamenei, who has published countless anti-Semitic tweets calling for the "genocidal" elimination of the State of Israel, while simultaneously censoring the Tweets of President Trump. Cohanim went on to call upon Twitter to completely ban Khamenei from their platform. Cohanim has condemned the terrorist-designated group Hezbollah, citing their ties to Iran, and has publicly stated that the US praises countries which follow the US in designating Hezbollah a terrorist group and freezing their assets.

At the outset of the COVID-19 pandemic, Cohanim proclaimed that the emerging conspiracy theories blaming Jews for the global outbreak and spread of the Coronavirus are a "modern-day blood libel", and admonished government figures in Iran, Turkey, and the Palestinian Authority for spreading these conspiracy theories.

Personal life 
Cohanim was born in Tehran, Iran, to a Jewish family that fled the country at the start of the Islamic Revolution of 1979 and found refuge in the United States.

References

External links
 

American television journalists
American women television journalists
American Zionists
Living people
1972 births
Trump administration personnel
United States Department of State officials
Barnard College alumni
Yeshiva University faculty
Mass media people from Tehran
Exiles of the Iranian Revolution in the United States
American people of Iranian-Jewish descent
Iranian Jews
American politicians of Iranian descent
20th-century American Jews
21st-century American Jews